John Murray (born 1963) is an Australian epidemiologist and writer.

Life
Murray was born in 1963 in Adelaide, Australia.  In 1985, Murray received his medical degree.  He received a master's of public health from Johns Hopkins University.  He went on to the Centers for Disease Control's Epidemic Intelligence Service. He investigated the outbreak of diseases such as cholera and dysentery.

In fall 1999, he moved with his wife and daughter to Iowa, where he graduated from the Iowa Writers' Workshop.

In 2003, he published a collection of short stories.

Works

References

On Writing Interview, windreverpress, Michael Standiert
Caught Between Places, The Atlantic, Curtis Sittenfeld, April 2, 2003 
 A Few Short Notes on Tropical Butterflies: Stories By John Murray, WNYC
Foreign Bodies, Michael Gorra, The New York Times, April 13, 2003

1963 births
Iowa Writers' Workshop alumni
Living people
Johns Hopkins University alumni
Australian public health doctors
Writers from Adelaide
Australian male short story writers